The judiciary of Gibraltar is a branch of the Government of Gibraltar that interprets and applies the law of Gibraltar, to ensure equal justice under law, and to provide a mechanism for dispute resolution. The legal system of Gibraltar is based on English law and is a mix of common law and statute. The hierarchical system of courts includes a magistrates' court, a supreme court and a non-resident appellate court.

Judicial Committee of the Privy Council

The highest court of appeal for Gibraltar is the Judicial Committee of the Privy Council in London, able to hear appeals from the Gibraltar Court of Appeal.

European Court of Justice
In relation to matters of European Community Law, the European Court of Justice is the highest authority.

European Court of Human Rights

Court of Appeal
The next highest court is the Court of Appeal. This court is composed of an odd number of judges not fewer than three. The Chief Justice is an ex-officio member of the Court of Appeal but may not hear appeals of his own decisions.

Supreme Court of Gibraltar
The Supreme Court is composed of four judges — the Chief Justice and a further three puisne judges appointed by the Governor. The Court hears civil and criminal proceedings, including Family Jurisdiction, Court of Protection, Admiralty Jurisdiction and Ordinary (Chancery) Jurisdiction. The Supreme Court hears appeals from the Magistrates' Court.

Subordinate courts
The lower courts are the Coroner's Court and the Magistrates' Court — this court hears mainly criminal and family cases. Below the Magistrates' Court, there are also tribunals for social security, tax and employment matters.

New buildings

New courts were opened in September 2012 by the Minister of Justice Gilbert Licudi. The new purpose-built building houses seven courts, one for a coroner, two for magistrates and four courtrooms for the Supreme Court.

References

External links
 Gibraltar Courts Service
 Organisation of Justice in Gibraltar (pdf)

Gibraltar, Court system of
Gibraltar law
Gibraltar
British Overseas Territories courts